Logan Sama is an English Grime DJ from Brentwood, Essex. He has appeared regularly throughout his career on radio stations Rinse, Kiss 100 and BBC Radio 1. He also currently runs the record labels Adamantium Music, Earth616 and KeepinItGrimy through which he has released projects for artists and producers across vinyl and digital formats. He also founded KeepinItGrimy, a brand entirely focused on Grime activity.

Career 

Logan embarked on his radio career on local Essex pirate station Plush FM hosting several cover shows playing underground garage in 2002. Towards the end of 2002 he was recruited to London then-pirate station Rinse FM. His last Rinse show was captured on video and featured Wiley, Skepta, Trim, Ruff Sqwad, Tinchy Stryder, Newham Generals and many others.

He moved to London's Kiss 100 in the spring of 2005 and began a late night specialist Grime show running from 2am-4am on Thursday night/Friday morning. The show later moved timeslot to Monday 11pm1am where it became the leading show amongst young people within London at that time, capturing over 61, 000 listeners in the Greater London area as certified by RAJAR.

Logan won multiple 'Grime Awards', public voted awards that were given to the best grime acts in different categories by GrimeForum. He currently holds the record for most awards won by a single act with 7 separate wins.

Logan left Kiss FM in 2014, along with DJ EZ and Hannah Wants following changes that saw many specialist DJs moved to the digital only KissFresh channel, and immediately took up a residency on the new SixtyMinutes rotating, regular guest mix feature on MistaJam's BBC Radio 1xtra show. From November 2015 he re-joined BBC Radio 1Xtra covering for Sian Anderson (until February 2016) on Tuesdays 10pm, covering the best of Grime. In 2016 he was brought on to the BBC Radio 1 Residency line up.

After being announced as taking up a new regular weekly show on Friday nights on 1xtra, on 7 November the BBC released a statement that Logan would no longer be hosting the show. A statement from Logan referenced a number of publicly visible tweets made between 2011 and 2015 that perpetuated negative stereotypes offensive to women, specifically of mixed black heritage, that were brought to the attention of the BBC who made the decision he would be unsuitable to join the network. Subsequently, he also left the Radio 1 Residency position.

In January 2018, Logan joined Rinse FM once again as part of their new The Grime Show residency alongside DJs; Spooky, GrandMixxer and AG. The once a month rotating residency replaced Spyro's show who had been brought in to 1xtra to cover the show vacated by Logan. In April 2019, The Grime Show was dissolved.

Logan began recording a regular video podcast under his KeepinItGrimy brand in February. The weekly podcast was published on YouTube and followed on audio only platforms. It takes the form of casual conversation with his associates within the Grime scene.

Logan also maintains the KeepinItGrimy playlist on Spotify, where he aggregates new Grime releases as a resource for fans.

Logan has released several mixtapes on the scene including The War Report, a collection of War Dubs from some popular Grime artists such as Wiley, Scorcher, Ghetts and Devlin and Oneaway Style, a free mixtape in association with NikeiD. He often releases free downloads for his fans. He also mixed live Tropical 2. 0, released through Boy Better Know records.

On 29 June 2019 he did commentary for All Elite Wrestling (AEW) during the Fyter Fest pre-show.

Personal life 

Outside of music, Logan is most known for his love of trainers/sneakers. Focusing predominantly on Nike Air Max models, his collection is very large and he is an active member in the Sneaker Culture community. He was once personally gifted a pair of Off White Nike Air Max 90s by Virgil Abloh. Logan has collaborated with Nike many times in the past including a Grime mixtape curated to celebrate the launch of Niketown London's NikeID suite, as well as DJing numerous Air Max Day and product activation events. Logan performed at Skepta's SK Air launch event in 2018 and the Nike TN3 launch in 2019.

Logan enjoys video games, in particular the Street Fighter series. He has become a prominent member of the competitive community and regularly commentates competitive Street Fighter events across the world, often working with Femi “F-Word” Adeboye. He hosts a weekly show for Capcom UK on their Twitch and YouTube channel. He has been a commentator for some of the most prestigious events such as Capcom Cup Finals held in San Francisco, California, Red Bull Kumite and EVO. He is currently part of the semi-regular Gfinity Elite Series show as a commentator for their Street Fighter V broadcasts. Logan also organises events for the Street Fighter community under the WinnerStaysOn brand. These have been held at the Red Bull Gaming Sphere and Capcom UK's London office. He is also a supporter of West Ham United F.C.

Discography

DJ Mixes

References

External links 

 Logan Sama official website.

English DJs
Esports commentators
Grime music artists
Living people
Year of birth missing (living people)
People from Brentwood, Essex
Musicians from Essex